Bryn Mawr may refer to:

Settlements 
 Brynmawr, a market town in Blaenau Gwent, Wales

United States 
 Bryn Mawr, California
 Bryn Mawr Historic District, Edgewater, Chicago, Illinois
 Bryn Mawr, Minneapolis, Minnesota
 Bryn Mawr, Granville, Ohio
 Bryn Mawr, Pennsylvania
 Bryn Mawr-Skyway, Washington
 Bryn Mawr, Orlando, Florida

Schools 
 Bryn Mawr College, Bryn Mawr, Pennsylvania, U.S.
 Bryn Mawr School, Baltimore, Maryland, U.S.
 Bryn Mawr Elementary School, Chicago, U.S.

Train stations 
 Brynmawr railway station, Wales
 Bryn Mawr station (CTA), a Chicago 'L' station in Edgewater, Chicago, Illinois, U.S.
 Bryn Mawr station (Norristown High Speed Line), a SEPTA station in Radnor Township, Pennsylvania, U.S.
 Bryn Mawr station (SEPTA Regional Rail), a SEPTA station in Bryn Mawr, Pennsylvania
 Bryn Mawr station (Metra), a Metra station in South Shore, Chicago, Illinois

Other uses
 Bryn Mawr (horse), a racehorse
 Bryn Mawr Stereo, a defunct consumer electronics retail chain
 Bryn Mawr Classical Review, an open-access journal
 Harriton House (originally Bryn Mawr), a historic house in Pennsylvania, U.S.